Abdul-Aziz Murtala Nyako  (born 19 December 1970) is a senator of the Federal Republic of Nigeria from Adamawa State. He represents Adamawa central in the current 8th National Assembly. Senator Nyako is the chairman of the Special Duties Committee of the 8th National Assembly.

Nyako was elected as a senator into the  8th National Assembly under the All Progressives Congress (APC) but later decamped to the African Democratic Congress to contest as governor for Adamawa. He is the son of the former governor of Adamawa state, Murtala Nyako.

Adamawa central Senatorial District covers seven local government areas.

References

1971 births
Living people
People from Adamawa State
Candidates in the 2019 Nigerian general election
Politicians from Adamawa state
Adamawa State politicians
Peoples Democratic Party members of the Senate (Nigeria)